Marion Vernoux (born 29 June 1966) is a French director and screenwriter.

Life and career 
Born in Montreuil, Seine-Saint-Denis, Vernoux was the only daughter of a casting director and of a set decorator. After several experiences as a production assistant, she debuted in 1988 as co-director of the music video for the song "N'importe quoi" by Florent Pagny, and in 1990 she wrote the film Pacific Palisades, inspired by her own experiences. In 1991 she made her feature film debut with Pierre qui roule, which was well received by critics. Her 1999 film Empty Days was entered into the main competition at the 56th edition of the Venice Film Festival, winning the President of the Italian Senate's Gold Medal.

Personal life 
Vernoux was married to director Jacques Audiard, with whom she had three children.

Filmography

References

External links 

 

1964 births
French film directors
People from Montreuil, Seine-Saint-Denis
Living people
21st-century French actresses
20th-century French actresses
French women film directors
French women screenwriters
French screenwriters